Superstars of Dance was an American reality television show, first broadcast on January 4, 2009, on NBC.  The show featured dance routines from eight countries from six continents.  It was hosted by Michael Flatley, co-creator of Riverdance and creator of Lord of the Dance, and was co-hosted by former Miss USA title holder Susie Castillo. It was created by executive producers Nigel Lythgoe and Simon Fuller, co-producers of So You Think You Can Dance and American Idol.

Background
On November 17, 2008 NBC announced it had ordered a new reality program titled Superstar Dancers of the World, which would feature competitors from eight international teams and would be produced by Simon Fuller and Nigel Lythgoe of American Idol fame. NBC billed the show as "equal parts sporting event, rock concert, and artistic exhibition" and Lythgoe called it "the most challenging and exhilarating project I've ever done."

Superstars of Dance differed from similar TV dance competitions by featuring professionals instead of amateurs, including several world champions. The contestants were chosen by their respective countries, rather than by the show's producers. Flatley compared the show to a sporting competition such as the Olympic Games.

The winners were decided by a panel of eight judges, as the producers felt it would be unfair to decide the winner by phone-in votes, assuming the American public would probably just vote for the American team.

The teams

†Damien O'Kane was replaced by Bernadette Flynn for the semi-final round of the competition.
‡Pasha Kovalev and Anya Garnis was replaced by Pasha & Aliona Riazantsev for the semi-final round of the competition
Competitors in bold won their respective categories.

The judges

Episode 1
The first episode was aired on Sunday, January 4, 2009.

Episode 2
The second episode of Superstars of Dance aired on January 5, 2009. The show marked the end of the quarterfinals and with it the first eliminations.  At the end of the evening, eight soloists, two duos, and two groups were eliminated.

Standings after the quarter-finals

1Miriam Larici, Robert Muraine, and Sean Robinson were tied for 8th with 57 points going into the first elimination. Since only 8 could advance, a tie-breaking vote was called for from the five countries not involved. Muraine won four votes from South Africa, Ireland, Russia, and China, which put him through to the semifinal round. Robinson received one vote from India, while Larici received no votes.

Episode 3
The third episode of Superstars of Dance aired on January 12, 2009.

Episode 4
The fourth episode of Superstars of Dance aired on January 19, 2009. The other three groups, the other three duets, and the other four soloists:

Standings after the semi-finals

1The Australian Dance Theatre and The Irish team were tied in 3rd place with 62 points going into the first elimination. Since only 3 could advance, a tiebreaking vote was called for from the six countries not involved. The Australian Dance Theater won five votes from Argentina, India, South Africa, USA, and Russia. The Irish won one vote from China.

Standings after the finale

*The semi-finals were split over episodes 3 and 4, with an unbalanced number of contestants from each country participating in each episode.
Bold font indicates the highest scoring team on a performance show.
Italic font indicates the lowest scoring team on a performance show.

Notes

References
Episode recaps by Tamara Brooks at Zap2it.com: Episode 1 2 3
Episode recaps by Sammi-T  at TVgrapevine.com: Episode 1 2 3
Episode recaps by Iguanachocolate at FansOfRealityTV.com: Episode 1 2

External links
 
 

2009 American television series debuts
2009 American television series endings
2000s American reality television series
Dance competition television shows